Scheuerman is a surname. Notable people with the surname include:

Ross Scheuerman (born 1993), American football player
Sharm Scheuerman (1934–2010), American basketball player and coach

See also
Scheuermann